Kodakandla is a village and a mandal in Jangaon district in the state of Telangana in India. It was formerly found in Warangal district before the division of Warangal district.

References 

Mandals in Jangaon district
Villages in Jangaon district